Bernardo de Saavedra (1681-1722) was a Spanish politician and soldier, who served as alcalde, procurador and regidor of Buenos Aires.

Biography 
Saavedra was born in Buenos Aires, the son of Pedro de Saavedra and Clara Gutiérrez de Paz, belonging to a distinguished family of Spanish Creole roots. He was married to Ana de la Palma y Lobatón, daughter of Francisco de la Palma Lobatón, born in Granada, and Antonia del Pozo Silva, born in the city. 

He was elected alcalde of 2nd vote in 1721, and served for several periods as regidor of the Cabildo of Buenos Aires. He also served as Acting Attorney General of the city of Buenos Aires. Among his descendants are Cornelio de Saavedra, president of the Primera Junta, and Cornelio Saavedra Rodríguez, a Chilean politician and military born in Santiago.

References 

1681 births
1722 deaths
Spanish colonial governors and administrators
People from Buenos Aires
Mayors of Buenos Aires